Cassare or calissare (from Portuguese casar, "to marry") was the term applied to the marriage alliances, largely in West Africa, set up between European and African slave traders; the "husband" was European and the wife/concubine African. This was not marriage under Christian auspices, although there might be an African ceremony; there were few clerics in equatorial Africa, and the "wives" could not marry since they had not been baptized. Male monogamy was not expected. As such, concubinage is a more accurate term. The multinational Quaker slave trader and polygamist, Zephaniah Kingsley purchased the Wolof princess, Anna Kingsley, who had earlier been enslaved and sold in Cuba, after being captured in modern-day Senegal.

Cassare created political and economic bonds. The name is European, and reflects similar relationships of Portuguese men, who were the first explorers of the west African coast. But it antedated European contact; selling a daughter, if not for cash then for some economic benefit, including simple peace, was pre-European practice used to integrate the "other" from a differing African ethnic group. Powerful West African groups with ties to the slave trade used these marriages to strengthen their alliances with European men by marrying off (selling) their daughters. Early on in the Atlantic slave trade, these marriages were common. The marriages were sometimes performed using African customs, which Europeans did not object to, seeing how important the connections were. African wives could receive money and schooling for the children they bore to European men. Wives could also inherit slaves and property from their husbands when they returned to Europe or died.

Many coastal ethnic groups in West Africa, such as the Ga and Fante, used this system to gain political and economic advantages. It enabled Africans to trust strangers, like the Europeans, when dealing within their trade networks. It made the transition from strangers to trading partners a lot smoother.

See also
Dutch Slave Coast
Gold Coast Euro-Africans
Mulatto
Signare

References

African slave trade
18th century in Ghana
Interracial marriage
Concubinage